Ascope District is one of eight districts of the province Ascope in Peru. According to 2020 census, the population of the district is 6855.

See also
Ascope city

References